{{DISPLAYTITLE:C24H26N2O6}}
The molecular formula C24H26N2O6 (molar mass: 438.473 g/mol, exact mass: 438.1791 u) may refer to:

 JTE-907
 Suxibuzone

Molecular formulas